The Karl Jaspers Society of North America (KJSNA) is a philosophy organization founded on December 28, 1980 by George B. Pepper (Iona College), Edith Ehrlich, and Leonard H. Ehrlich (University of Massachusetts Amherst) to promote study and research on the ideas of Karl Jaspers and related issues in continental philosophy. The prospect of forming this society emerged from the research by these scholars while preparing a systematic reader of the basic philosophical writings of Karl Jaspers. Enthusiastic response to the reader prompted Pepper and Ehrlich to conclude that a learned society to study the work of Jaspers should be founded.

Since 1980 the Karl Jaspers Society of North America (KJSNA) has conducted its annual meetings with the American Philosophical Association (APA) and occasionally with the Society for Phenomenology and Existential Philosophy (SPEP).  Selected papers of KJSNA meetings are published, since 2005, in the Open Source on-line journal Existenz, co-edited by Alan M. Olson (Boston University) and Helmut Wautischer (California State University at Sonoma) from 2006-2015. Since 2016 Helmut Wautischer is the journal's Editor-in-Chief. Research and writing presented at the annual meetings of KJSNA is automatically being considered for publication, although Existenz also welcomes unsolicited related materials in philosophy, religion, politics, and the arts. The 30th Anniversary of KJSNA is celebrated in a collection of essays co-edited by Helmut Wautischer, Alan M. Olson, and Gregory J. Walters entitled, Philosophical Faith and the Future of Humanity,(Springer Verlag, 2011).

The Society (KJSNA) has played a leading role in the organization of international meetings of Jaspers societies at World Congress of Philosophy, in cooperation with the Karl Jaspers Stiftung of Basel, the Jaspers Society of Japan, the Österreichische Karl-Jaspers-Gesellschaft, and the Jaspers Society of Poland. The first international meeting was held in Montreal 1983 at the XVII World Congress of Philosophy. Subsequent meetings have been held at the XVIII World Congress of Philosophy in Brighton, England (1988); the XIX World Congress of Philosophy in Moscow (1993); the XX World Congress of Philosophy in Boston (1998); the XXI World Congress of Philosophy in Istanbul (2003); the XXII World Congress of Philosophy in Seoul, Korea (2008); and the XXIII World Congress of Philosophy in Athens, Greece (2013). In 2018, KJSNA was the official organizer of the Eight International Jaspers Conference in conjunction with the XXIV. World Congress of Philosophy in Beijing, China.

The proceedings of the meetings of the International Association of Karl Jaspers Societies listed above have been published under the following titles: 
 Karl Jaspers Today: Philosophy at the Threshold of the Future
 Karl Jaspers: Philosopher Among Philosophers
 Karl Jaspers: On the Way to World Philosophy
 Karl Jaspers’ Philosophy: Rooted in the Present, Paradigm for the Future
 Karl Jaspers: Historic Actuality in View of the Fundamental Problems of Mankind
 Cross-Cultural Conflicts and Communication: Rethinking Jaspers' Philosophy Today
 For the 2018 conference, selected papers are included in subsequent issues of Existenz, starting with Volume 13, No.1, Spring 2018.

The Karl Jaspers Society of North America is tax exempt under the U.S. Internal Revenue Code.

Further reading 
Karl Jaspers, Basic Philosophical Writings, edited and translated by Edith Ehrlich, Leonard H. Ehrlich, George B. Pepper, originally published by Ohio University Press in 1985 with a revised edition in paperback published by Prometheus Books in 1994.

References

External links 
Official KJSNA website
Paideia Project at Boston University
Existenz
Karl Jaspers Stiftung Basel, Switzerland
Karl Jaspers - What Is Philosophy?(English Subtitles)
Karl Jaspers Interview (1968) - A Self-Portrait (English Subtitles)
Jaspers-Jahr 2008

Organizations established in 1980
Continental philosophy organizations
Existentialist organizations
Organizations based in Boston
Philosophical societies in the United States